The lesser short-toed lark has been split into two species:

 Mediterranean short-toed lark, Alaudala rufescens
 Turkestan short-toed lark, Alaudala heinei

Birds by common name